Peter Prince Field  is a public-use airport located  east of the central business district of the city of Milton in Santa Rosa County, Florida, United States. The airport is publicly owned.

References

External links
 

Airports in Florida
Transportation buildings and structures in Santa Rosa County, Florida